Gideon Andries van Rensburg (born 24 January 1982) is a former South African rugby union footballer. His regular playing position was winger or centre.

In 2009, while still a Leopards player, he also earned a call-up to the  side during the 2009 Super 14 season and joined the  prior to the 2010 Currie Cup Premier Division season. He also played in two matches during the 2009 British & Irish Lions tour to South Africa, one for a Highveld XV side in Potchefstroom and one for an Emerging Springboks side in Cape Town.

A persistent leg injury led to Van Rensburg missing the 2014 Currie Cup Premier Division season and eventually his retirement at the end of the 2014 season.

References

External links

Lions profile
itsrugby.co.uk profile

1982 births
Living people
Afrikaner people
Golden Lions players
Leopards (rugby union) players
Lions (United Rugby Championship) players
Rugby union players from Potchefstroom
Rugby union wings
South African people of Dutch descent
South African rugby union players